Mohamed Najib Boulif, commonly known as Najib Boulif (born 1964 in Tangier, Morocco) is a Moroccan politician from the Justice and Development Party. On 3 January 2011 he became Minister delegate for general affairs and good governance.

Najib Boulif is a professor of economics at the Faculté des Sciences Juridiques, Economiques et Sociales in Tangier, and has authored books on Islamic finance and Micro-finance.

See also
Justice and Development Party

References

External links
Ministry of general affairs and good governance

Living people
Government ministers of Morocco
People from Tangier
1964 births
Moroccan economists
Paris 2 Panthéon-Assas University alumni
Sidi Mohamed Ben Abdellah University alumni
Justice and Development Party (Morocco) politicians